Michael Berry (born December 10, 1991) is an American sprinter, who specializes in the 400 meters. Berry was part of the USA team that won the gold medal in the 4 × 400 m relay at the 2011 World Championships in Athletics.

A native of Seattle, Washington, Berry attended Rainier Beach High School. In 2010 he received a three-month ban after testing positive for cannabis.

References

External links

DyeStat profile for Michael Berry
Oregon Ducks bio

1991 births
Living people
Track and field athletes from Seattle
Oregon Ducks men's track and field athletes
American male sprinters
Doping cases in athletics
American sportspeople in doping cases
World Athletics Championships winners